The Destroyer Carbine is a small bolt-action carbine usually chambered for the 9 x 23 mm Largo cartridge. It was used by Spanish police and prison services, including the Guardia Civil from the mid-1930s until the late 1960s, replacing the El Tigre Rifle. It continued the tradition, started in the 1890s, of issuing police units with a short, handy, repeating carbine in pistol ammunition calibre.

Design 

It is essentially a scaled-down Mauser Model 1893 with two rear-mounted locking lugs and a Mauser-style two-position flip safety. The Destroyer fired the same ammunition as the standard-issue police handgun but used a 6-shot single stack magazine. The longer rifle barrel resulted in greater muzzle velocity, accuracy, and range.

The Destroyer was initially manufactured in Eibar, Spain by Gaztanaga y Compania, then by Ayra Duria S.A. and possibly others, with some minor improvements made over time. 

The carbine is more accurate than a self-loading service pistol, not because of its barrel length, but mainly due to the lack of moving parts and the stable firing platform offered by a weapon with a sturdy shoulder stock. Due to the longer barrel, muzzle velocity was commonly 200fps-300fps higher than achieved by pistols. The better sights and longer sight radius are also critical in allowing the user to hit targets at greater distances. 

While no longer in government service, the Destroyer Carbine is prized as a collectors item due to its comparative rarity, as well as being a desirable target rifle due to favorable shooting characteristics such as minimal recoil and relatively inexpensive ammunition.

While all rimless 9 mm caliber pistol cartridges will chamber in a Destroyer Carbine, and consequently will fire, it is extremely unsafe to use ammunition other than 9 x 23 mm Largo due to the dangers of excessive pressure. Some late-production experimental Destroyer Carbines were produced in other calibers such as .38 Auto or 9 mm Para and are even more highly sought after.

The magazines for the Destroyer Carbine are of 6-round capacity.

External links 
 Destroyer Carbine overview at 9mmLargo.com

Bolt-action rifles
Rifles of Spain
9mm Largo firearms
Police weapons
Carbines